St. Lawrence's Boys' School is a private Catholic primary and secondary school for boys located in Karachi, Sindh, Pakistan. Established in 1950, the school is owned by the Roman Catholic Archdiocese of Karachi, has been described as a reputable private institution providing an immaculate standard of education.

History
Soon after St. Lawrence's Parish opened in 1929, two schools were started to serve the community.

The parish opened the Infant Jesus School managed by the Daughters of the Cross. It had nursery and primary school classes. The Jufelhurst school, although privately owned, had classes up to the matriculation and senior Cambridge levels. At the primary level, it had boys as well as girls.

Although both accepted boys at the primary level, a separate parish school for boys from the primary level upwards was required. In December 1950, the parish priest Fr. Victorino Fernandes started St. Thomas's School in a room of the parish house. He changed the name to St. Lawrence's Boys' School in 1951.

In 1954, Fr. Joshua Sterk became the principal and took the school a step forward, advancing to class IX at the beginning of scholastic year 1954–55. It was towards the end of the year that the school was visited for the first time by representatives of the Catholic Board of Education.

During the nationalisation of all schools and colleges in the country by the government in August 1972, the school, although originally on the nationalisation list, was later removed from the list.

Principals

 Mgr Victorino Fernandes – 1950–1951
 Fr. Francis de Souza – 1951–1954
 Fr. Joshua Sterk OFM – 1954–1968
 Fr. Armando Trindade – 1958–1962
 Fr. Canisius Mascarenhas – 1962–1970
 Fr. Anthony Theodore Lobo – 1970–1974
 Ann D'Souza – 1974-1987
 Fr. Ignatius Pinto – 1987–1988
 Myrtle Lobo – 1988–1992
 Michael Alphonso – 1992–2009
 Vincent D' Souza  – since 2009

Sports
The school promotes sports through participating in local events like the Askari Intermediate Inter-school cricket tournament at the KPI Ground on September 23, 2003.

Genius Champ 2010
In 2011, Basil Naeem  of St. Lawrence's won third prize in the 7th International Competition "Genius Champ 2010" in which more than 3,000 participants from all over the country competed.

Notable alumni
 Akbar Agha – author, educator and former diplomat
 Sikander Bakht – cricketeer who played for Pakistan as a fast bowler
 Tarek Fatah – author and columnist at the Toronto Sun

See also

 Christianity in Pakistan
 Education in Karachi
 List of schools in Karachi

References

1950 establishments in Pakistan
Boys' schools in Pakistan
Educational institutions established in 1950
Franciscan high schools
Jamshed Town
Catholic elementary and primary schools in Pakistan
Catholic secondary schools in Pakistan
Schools in Karachi